Estela Molly (1943 - August 13, 2017) was an Argentine actress.

References

1943 births
2017 deaths
20th-century Argentine actresses
21st-century Argentine actresses
Burials at La Chacarita Cemetery